Baron Emly, of Tervoe in the County of Limerick, was a title in the Peerage of the United Kingdom. It was created on 12 January 1874 for the Liberal politician William Monsell. He had previously served as President of the Board of Health, Paymaster-General and Postmaster General. He was succeeded by his only son from his second marriage, the second Baron. He had no surviving male issue and consequently the title became extinct on his death on 24 November 1932.

Barons Emly (1874)
William Monsell, 1st Baron Emly (1812–1894)
Thomas William Gaston Monsell, 2nd Baron Emly (1858–1932)

Arms

References

Sources

Extinct baronies in the Peerage of the United Kingdom
Noble titles created in 1874
Noble titles created for UK MPs